Lee Tressel (February 12, 1925 – April 16, 1981) was a football coach and athletic director at Baldwin–Wallace College in Berea, Ohio. Tressel accumulated the most winning record as the head football coach at Baldwin–Wallace. His 1978 team won the NCAA Division III Football Championship, achieved National Coach of that year, and in 1996 was inducted into the College Football Hall of Fame.

Career
Tressel served as football coach and athletic director at Baldwin–Wallace College in Berea, Ohio. Tressel accumulated a 155–52–6 record in 23 seasons (1958–1980) as the head football coach at Baldwin–Wallace. His 1978 team won the NCAA Division III Football Championship and for his efforts, Tressel was named National Coach of the Year that championship season.

Before coaching at Baldwin–Wallace, Tressel was a successful high school head coach in Ohio, with stops at Ada High School, Massillon Washington High School, and Mentor High School. At Mentor, Tressel put together a 34-game winning streak, while compiling a 16–3 mark in two seasons at Massillon.

Tressel was married to Eloise Tressel, who worked as the athletic historian at Baldwin–Wallace. Tressel is the father of Jim Tressel, who was the head football coach at Ohio State University from 2001 through the 2010 season. Another son, Dick, was the head football coach at Hamline University in Saint Paul, Minnesota for 23 seasons (1978–2000) and was later an assistant at Ohio State. Tressel was 56 at the time of his death from lung cancer.

Legacy

After Tressel's death in 1981 he was posthumously inducted into the College Football Hall of Fame. On the south side of the Baldwin–Wallace campus in Berea, there is a "Tressel Street" named in his honor. At the corners where Tressel Street starts and ends, at Bagley Road and E. Center Street, lay decorative street signs in honor of Lee and Eloise Tressel for their contributions to the Baldwin-Wallace campus. In 2012, the Football Field at George Finnie Stadium was dedicated to the Tressel Family.

Head coaching record

College

References

External links
 
 
 Encyclopedia of Baldwin Wallace History: Lee Tressel

1925 births
1981 deaths
American football fullbacks
Baldwin Wallace Yellow Jackets football coaches
Baldwin Wallace Yellow Jackets football players
High school football coaches in Ohio
College Football Hall of Fame inductees
United States Navy officers
United States Navy personnel of World War II
People from Ada, Ohio
Coaches of American football from Ohio
Players of American football from Ohio
Deaths from cancer in Ohio
Deaths from lung cancer